Un Quijote sin mancha (aka A Quixote Without La Mancha) is a 1969 Mexican comedy film directed by Miguel M. Delgado and starring Cantinflas, Ángel Garasa, Lupita Ferrer and Susana Salvat. The title is a pun on the title of the novel Don Quixote of La Mancha.

Plot
Justo Leal y Aventado (Cantinflas) is a law intern who receives classes from an old lawyer, Professor Ramón Arvide (Ángel Garasa), already retired, who lists the many ways Justo reminds him of the title character of Don Quijote, saying "You are a supporter of justice; you like to help the poor, even knowing how little, or nothing, they can give you. Anyway ... you are a pure man, and without spot."

Justo works as a law intern in the prestigious law firm of the Manceras, lawyers whose clientele is usually the elite. Just does not like the job, although he has a friend there in the secretary, Angélica (Lupita Ferrer). Justo asks for an increase in his salary, but he is never granted it. This, combined with the disgust he experiences in having to serve corrupt clients, leads Justo to resign, to devote himself to the defense of those who do not have with what to pay.

During the course of the film, Justo defends a series of clients. He releases Cirilo Pingarrón, a young man who is accused of stealing a television from the store where he works, from prison. Although Cirilo is actually guilty of the theft, Justo argues that he only wanted to take it to his home "to check how portable this portable television is" and "to be able to see, like any human being, that great match between América and Guadalajara," and that his intention was to return it the next day. Justo also calls attention to the fact that the store owner (a Spaniard whose accent is almost incomprehensible) pays Isidro only forty pesos a week, which he argues is far from being what establishes the law.

In another case, Justo also helps Sara Buenrostro (Susana Salvat), a young widow who wants to take her daughter away because she works as a nightclub dancer. He points out the hypocrisy of the accusers, indicating that the accusing lawyer (one of the Manceras with whom Justo had previously worked) has been seen sunbathing with a colleague's secretary. The shame, combined with the fact that Justo had gotten Mrs. Buenrostro another job as a telephone operator, causes the demand to be withdrawn, and the young mother keeps her daughter.

The neighborhood in which Justo lives, meanwhile, is under threat of the owner throwing out the tenants in order to raise rents. Justo takes their defense, and in a meeting called with the owner, Justo (taking advantage that he had bought a phone that had not yet been connected) pretends to have a telephone conversation with the Undersecretary of Health, including making the owner believe of a new law that would punish the lack of maintenance of homes with jail. Feeling threatened by the new law, and following the advice of Justo, the businessman not only decides not to throw out the tenants, but to make several fix-ups in the houses.

The same judge who presided over the case of Mrs. Buenrostro asks Justo to go find his son, who has left the home to devote himself to the hippie lifestyle. Justo dresses as a hippie to enter a club frequented by hippies where he finds the young man, and while trying to convince him to return home, the club is raided by the police and take everyone to jail, including Justo, whom they see as another of the hippies. Justo berates the young people in jail, criticizing their lack of love for work, telling them "you want to be free, yet you are becoming slaves of your own vices." Professor Arvide hears the news that Justo has been taken to jail, and runs to the police station to take him out, but leaves in such a hurry that he forgets to change his clothes and arrives dressed in pajamas, so the police take him for another hippie and put him in jail with Justo. After spending the night in jail, Justo, the professor, and the judge's son are released. The young man, repentant, promises Justo that his hippie days are over and returns home.

The neighbors celebrate the salvation of the neighborhood (and Justo's birthday) with a party. He is just about to declare his love for Angélica, when she announces that she and the businessman's son are engaged. During the party, Professor Arvide, while dancing with Angélica, suffers an attack; Justo accompanies him to his apartment, where the professor, after giving some final advice to Justo, dies.

In the last scene, a few days after the professor's death, many of the characters Justo has been able to help come to his home/office to thank him for his service. The film ends with Justo walking through the streets of Mexico City.

Cast
Cantinflas as Justo Leal y Aventado
Ángel Garasa as Professor Ramón Arvide
Lupita Ferrer as Angélica
Susana Salvat as Sara Buenrostro
Carlos Fernández as Lic. Alberto Borrego
Eduardo Alcaraz as Lawyer at Delegation
Luis Manuel Pelayo as Cirilo's Boss
Carlos Riquelme as Judge
Víctor Alcocer as Sr. Borrego
Angelines Fernández as Prudencia Pingarrón
Carlota Solares as Isabel Gavilán
Carlos Agostí as Gerardo Palomo
Roberto Meyer as Sr. Malpica
Agustín Isunza as Grandfather Mancera
Queta Carrasco as Doña Angustias
León Barroso as Lic. Tomás Mancera
Consuelo Monteagudo as Doña Candelaria
Rodolfo Roca
César Castro as Son of Judge
Victorio Blanco as Elderly Man in Elevator (uncredited)
Nora Cantú as Sara's Dancer Friend (uncredited)
Abel Cureño as Vecino (uncredited)
Felipe de Flores as Vecino (uncredited)
Sadi Dupeyrón as Cirilo (uncredited)
Pedro Elviro as Secretary in Delegation (uncredited)
Evelia Esquivel as Sra. Malpica (uncredited)
Rosa Furman as President of the Moral Council (uncredited)
Pepita González as President's Friend (uncredited)
Armando Gutiérrez as Chief of Police (uncredited)
Leonor Gómez as Neighbor (uncredited)
Benny Ibarra as Singer of Nightclub Band (uncredited)
Carlos Vendrell as Policeman (uncredited)
Jacqueline Voltaire as Dancer at Nightclub (uncredited) 
Eduardo Zamarripa as Neighbor (uncredited)

Analysis
In Cantinflas and the Chaos of Mexican Modernity, Professor Jeffrey M. Pilcher stated that the film was the second time where Cantiflas "denounced the local counterculture" by showing his character "in a nightclub filled with drugged-out beats" (after El señor doctor), stating in regards of the scene where his character berates a group of hippies in jail that "in berating the jipitecas for smoking dope instead of working, Moreno reversed the roles of his early movie, Ahí está el detalle, conceding to them the carefree younthful spirit of Cantinflas while he became the stodgy establishment figure played by Joaquín Pardavé [in Ahí está el detalle]." The film premiered two weeks before the first anniversary of the Tlatelolco massacre, which is not specifically mentioned in the film. Nonetheless, Pilcher argued that Cantinflas's denouncements against the counterculture among the youth were "Mario Moreno [joining in] the attempt to restore the legitimacy of the ruling party [the Institutional Revolutionary Party] by condemning the students as a threat to the nation." Pilcher also cited the film as an example of Cantinflas's career at the time having "reached a terminal decline", describing the courtroom scene as him having "tried to relive the triumphant courtroom scene from Ahí está el detalle; but where in 1940 Cantinflas had subverted the entire courtroom with his fast-talking nonsense, the best he could manage in 1969 was to accuse the prosecutor of vacationing in Acapulco with a bilingual secretary." Pilcher further noted "attempts to restore his youthful complexion", saying, "Most pathetic of all was his desire to have his youthful cake and eat it too by disguising himself in a mop-top wig and wire-rimmed glasses to dance with a go-go girl before lecturing the jipitecas. He appeared, in the end, like an ambivalent old parson, simultaneously seduced by the sins of youth and terrified for his immortal soul. While venting his wrath on middle-class youth, he also lost touch with the changing reality of the urban poor, always his most loyal audience."

References

Bibliography
Martínez Soria, Carlos Julián; Millán Martínez, Juan Manuel. Astrana Marín, Cervantes y Shakespeare: paralelismos y convergencias. Ediciones de la Universidad de Castilla La Mancha, 2018.
Pilcher, Jeffrey M. Cantinflas and the Chaos of Mexican Modernity. Rowman & Littlefield, 2001.

External links

1969 comedy films
1969 films
Mexican comedy films
Films directed by Miguel M. Delgado
Films about lawyers
1960s Mexican films